The Liberia Institute of Statistics and Geo-Information Services (LISGIS) is an agency of the Liberian government.  It organized a census in March 2008, 24 years after the last one.

References

External links
Official website

Government of Liberia
National statistical services